Kanda Naal Mudhal ( there) is a 2005 Indian Tamil language romantic comedy film written and directed by newcomer V. Priya, who had earlier assisted Mani Ratnam. Produced by Prakash Raj under the Duet Movies banner, the film stars Prasanna and Laila, with Karthik Kumar, Revathi, Lakshmi and Regina Cassandra in the supporting roles. The film's music was composed by Yuvan Shankar Raja. The film was released on 18 November 2005 with positive reviews. It also marked the acting debut of Regina Cassandra and actress, Andrea Jeremiah made her first on-screen appearance in an uncredited song sequel role.

Plot 
The movie begins with two kids who fight with each other in a marriage hall. They meet after two decades, now Krishna (Prasanna) and Ramya (Laila) during a college cultural meet and again lock horns with each other. Fate brings them together in Chennai after a few years, again fighting with each other. Meanwhile, a series of events forces Krishna's close friend  Aravind (Karthik Kumar) to come to India from the United States to get married. His parents arrange his wedding with Ramya. Ramya, who decides to marry to help her younger sister's love, displays herself as a passive character who accepts whatever her life partner feel is right. On the contrary, she is bold, active, independent and assertive in nature. Knowing this, Krishna tries hard to let her true character come out. However, Aravind stalls the wedding plans and returns to the USA as he finds Ramya as a person who does not think on her own and is not independent. Mistaking Krishna for influencing Aravind, Ramya locks horns with him.

Meanwhile, Ramya's sister elopes with her lover which causes her mother (Revathy) to end up in the hospital and Krishna comes to the help of the family and eventually develops an affinity for Ramya which turns into romance. Enters Aravind now with a decision to marry Ramya. The climax was expected after the closeness between Ramya and Krishna. In the end, at the airport when they both come to receive Aravind they end up in each other's arms and Aravind also approves of it.

Cast 

Prasanna as Krishna
Laila as Ramya
Revathi as Maragatham
Karthik Kumar as Aravind
Lakshmi as Ramani
Devadarshini as Krishna's sister
Regina Cassandra as Latha, Ramya's sister
Srinivasa Moorthy as Shankar
Jagan as Krishna's friend
Andrea Jeremiah as a girl at the final wedding scene
Premgi Amaran in a special appearance

Soundtrack 
The soundtrack composed by Yuvan Shankar Raja, features 6 tracks with lyrics written by Thamarai. The album was released on 17 October 2005 at Taj Connemara Hotel. The Carnatic song Kanda Naal Mudhalai was remixed for the film. Singer Subhiksha Rangarajan was 15 when she recorded the song. Behindwoods wrote "Yuvan’ music has got to do something in this movie and it could be a big reason for the success of the movie. From, his side he has done an excellent job".

Critical reception 
Rediff wrote "The fresh treatment and Priya's conviction are evident. But what goes against the film is its script." The Hindu wrote "From the title to the treatment everything about Duet Movies' `Kanda Naal Mudhal' glistens with a poetic touch, and first-time filmmaker Priya V. proves with each frame that she's here to stay. Boy-girl tussles leading to love are not new to cinema. But plaudits to the way Priya weaves her story and characters into an enjoyable film!" Sify wrote "Kanda Naal Mudhal directed by debutant Priya V is in good taste without a shred of vulgarity, violence or risque comedy that has become the bane of Tamil cinema. Priya deserves a pat on her back for weaving a gossamer romance like her mentor Mani sir did in Mounam Ragam or Alaipayuthe. But the film has its own minor drawbacks mostly in narration and lags especially in the second half".

References

External links 
 

2005 films
2005 romantic comedy films
Films about Indian weddings
2000s Tamil-language films
Films scored by Yuvan Shankar Raja
2005 directorial debut films
Indian romantic comedy films